Namsos is a town and the administrative center of Namsos municipality in Trøndelag county, Norway. It is located on the north side of the mouth of the river Namsen, where it flows into Namsenfjorden.  The village of Spillum lies across the river on the south side.

The Norwegian County Road 17 runs through the town and just east of the town is Namsos Airport, Høknesøra. The town was the terminus of the Namsos Line from 1933 until its closure in 2002.  The town is the site of the Namsos Hospital which serves the whole region.  Namsos Church is located in the town centre.

History

The village of Namsos was declared to be a ladested in 1845.  At that time, it was separated from the municipality of Vemundvik of which it was a part prior to that time.  The new town (Ladested Namsos) had 591 inhabitants and the rest of Vemundvik was then called Namsos herred or Namsos landdistrikt and it had 908 residents after the split.

Areas of Vemundvik lying adjacent to the town of Namsos were later annexed by the town on numerous occasions. On 1 January 1882, an area with 109 inhabitants was moved to the town.  On 1 July 1921 an area with 927 inhabitants was again transferred to Namsos.  Then, on 1 July 1957, another area with a population of 6 was transferred to Namsos. 

In 1940, the town was bombed in the Namsos Campaign. 

During the 1960s, there were many municipal mergers across Norway due to the work of the Schei Committee.  On 1 January 1964, the neighboring municipalities of Vemundvik (population: 2,040) and Klinga (population: 2,482) plus the parts of Otterøy municipality located north of the Namsenfjorden (population: 1,013) and the Finnangerodden area on the island of Otterøya in Fosnes municipality (population: 116) were all merged with the town of Namsos (population: 5,224) to create a new (much larger) municipality of Namsos with 10,875 residents.

Name
The town is named Namsos, which is also the name of the municipality in which it is located.  The first part of the name comes from the local river Namsen. The last element is os, which means the "mouth of a river".

Coat of arms
The coat of arms of the town of Namsos was granted on 5 May 1961.  The arms were re-granted on 21 October 1966 when the town was merged with several other areas to form the municipality of Namsos. The arms show a golden moose head on a red background.  The moose was chosen as a symbol for the municipality, since Namsos is the capital of the forest-rich Namdalen region, and the moose is the "king of the forest".

Media gallery

References

Populated places in Trøndelag
Cities and towns in Norway
Namsos
1845 establishments in Norway
Former municipalities of Norway